Sumang LRT station is an elevated Light Rail Transit (LRT) station on the Punggol LRT line West Loop in Punggol, Singapore, along Punggol Way between the junctions of Sumang Link and Punggol Central.

Etymology
The name is derived from a famous Malay warrior, Wak Sumang, who founded Punggol village, also known as Kampong Wak Sumang.

History

On 18 June 2014, SBS Transit announced that Nibong, Sumang and Soo Teck will be the first stations to open in the Punggol LRT line West Loop. The station opened on 29th of that month at 11.15 am.

References

Railway stations in Singapore opened in 2014
Punggol
LRT stations in Punggol
Railway stations in Punggol
Light Rail Transit (Singapore) stations